Peaked Mountain may refer to:

 Peaked Mountain (Massachusetts)
 Peaked Mountain Co-op
 Peaked Mountain (New Hampshire)
 Peaked Mountain (Hamilton County, New York)

See also
 Peaked Mountain Lake, New York
 Peaked Hill (disambiguation)